Riverside School District is a school district headquartered in Chattaroy, Washington. The district contains 5 schools in the surrounding area.

Schools
 Riverside High School
 Riverside Middle School
 Chattaroy Elementary School
 Riverside Elementary School
 Riverside Achievement Center

Student Data
From circa 2000 to 2020 annually the number of students fell by about 3%. However, from 2019 to 2020 the school district had an increase from about 1,280 students to 1,538 students. The enrollment increase gave the district funds to buy additional equipment.

In the 2019-2020 school year, Riverside held a 90% rate of regular student attendance along with 90.1% graduation rate. 85% are deemed "On Track" (a statistic measuring the percentage of students who passed all 9th grade courses). At Riverside High School in the 2018-2019 school year, 438 students were enrolled, with about 56% of student enrollment male and 44% female.

References

External links
 Riverside School District

School districts in Washington (state)
Education in Spokane County, Washington